The Athletics at the 2016 Summer Paralympics – Women's 400 metres T11 event at the 2016 Paralympic Games took place on 16 September 2016, at the Estádio Olímpico João Havelange.

Heats

Heat 1 
19:54 15 September 2016:

Heat 2 
20:00 15 September 2016:

Heat 3 
20:06 15 September 2016:

Final 
17:30 16 September 2016:

Notes

Athletics at the 2016 Summer Paralympics